Kazhakuttam railway station (Code:KZK) is one of the 5 railway stations serving the Indian city of Trivandrum, capital of the state, Kerala. It lies on Kollam–Thiruvananthapuram rail line. Kazhakuttam is currently the 4th most revenue generating railway station in Trivandrum district. The station falls under the Thiruvananthapuram railway division of the Southern Railway zone, Indian Railways. Kaniyapuram and Veli railway Stations are the nearby stations on the north and south respectively.

Significance

It is located at Kazhakoottam, which is significant for its proximity to the IT hub of the state Technopark, Sainik School, Kinfra Film and Video Park, Vikram Sarabhai Space Centre, DCSMAT media school, PRASAD film lab, Vismayas Max.Employees of Technopark and VSSC hugely rely on this station.  Food Corporation of India godown is also situated in the railway station premises.

Layout

The station has currently three platforms. Recently, a basic food kiosk has been also added. A high-resolution, LED-based integrated passenger information system has been introduced at Thiruvananthapuram Central, Kollam, Ernakulam Jn and Thrissur, and will soon be introduced at Kazhakkoottam.

Services
Some of the trains stopping at the station:

Express trains

Passenger Trains

See also
 Trivandrum Central
 Kochuveli railway station
 Indian Rail Info

References

Railway stations in Thiruvananthapuram
Thiruvananthapuram railway division